CAE Aviation is an aviation company based in Luxembourg providing services such as aerial surveillance, reconnaissance, parachuting and maintenance to various international governmental agencies and private operators. The business is unrelated to Canadian flight simulator manufacturer CAE.

History 
Founded in 1971, CAE Aviation initially specialised in aircraft maintenance. Since the 1980s the company has diversified into aerial surveillance and reconnaissance.

Services 
With a fleet comprising six different types of turboprop aircraft – mainly of the Beechcraft King Air and Fairchild Metro families – CAE Aviation provides aerial surveillance, military parachuting and airborne geophysics services. The company also runs a service centre for Wescam airborne cameras in Lapalisse, France.

Fleet 
As of August 2019 the CAE Aviation fleet includes the following aircraft:
 1 Saab 340B(AEW)

Accidents

References 

Aviation companies of Luxembourg
1971 establishments in Luxembourg